Hammond is a civil parish in Kings County, New Brunswick, Canada.

The local service district is a member of Regional Service Commission 8 (RSC8).

Origin of name
The parish was named for the Hammond River, which in turn took its name from Sir Andrew Snape Hamond, former Governor of Nova Scotia, who received a land grant on the river in 1787.

History
Hammond was erected in 1858 from the eastern part of Upham Parish.

In 1875 the boundary with Sussex and Waterford Parishes was adjusted.

Boundaries
Hammond Parish is bounded:

on the north by a line beginning at a point 825 metres north of the western end of Cassidy Lake at the prolongation of the eastern line of a grant to Samuel Deforest southwest of the lake, then easterly in a direct line to the northeastern corner of a grant to William Thompson, about 450 metres south of the southern tip of Walton Lake and about 150 metres west of the Creek Road, then running south 88º east to a point on the Albert County line about 1.65 kilometres south-southeast from Route 114;
on the east by the Albert County line;
on the south by the Saint John County line;
on the west by the eastern line of the Deforest grant, part of which runs along a straight stretch of Route 865, prolonged southerly to the Saint John County line and northerly to the starting point.

Governance
The entire parish forms the local service district of the parish of Hammond, established in 1968 to assess for fire protection. First aid and ambulance services were added to the assessment in 1972. Recreational facilities were added to the assessment in 1994, with first aid and ambulance services being removed at the same time.

Communities
Communities at least partly within the parish;
Devine Corner
Hammondvale
Hillsdale
Londonderry
Poodiac

Bodies of water
Bodies of water at least partly in the parish:
Big Salmon River
Hammond River
Little Salmon River
Point Wolfe River
Quiddy River
Cassidy Lake
more than a dozen other officially named lakes

Other notable places
Parks, historic sites, and other noteworthy places at least partly in the parish.

 Fundy National Park
 McManus Hill Protected Natural Area
 Point Wolfe River Gorge Protected Natural Area
 Saddleback Brook Protected Natural Area

Demographics

Population
Population trend

Language
Mother tongue (2016)

Access Routes
Highways and numbered routes that run through the parish, including external routes that start or finish at the parish limits:

Highways

Principal Routes
None

Secondary Routes:

External Routes:
None

See also
List of parishes in New Brunswick

Notes

References

Parishes of Kings County, New Brunswick
Local service districts of Kings County, New Brunswick